Echinodiscus is a genus of sand dollars within the family Astriclypeidae. There are currently 14 species assigned to the genus, with a majority being extinct.

Species 

 Echinodiscus andamanensis 
 Echinodiscus bisperforatus 
 †Echinodiscus chikuzenensis 
 †Echinodiscus colchesterensis 
 †Echinodiscus ellipticus 
 †Echinodiscus formosus 
 †Echinodiscus ginauensis 
 †Echinodiscus hsianglanensis 
 †Echinodiscus pedemontanus 
 †Echinodiscus placenta 
 †Echinodiscus tiliensis 
 †Echinodiscus transiens 
 Echinodiscus truncatus 
 †Echinodiscus yeliuensis

References 

Astriclypeidae
Echinoidea genera